Gennady Ivanovich Ivanchenko (born 30 July 1947) is a retired Soviet light-heavyweight weightlifter. He won the Soviet and European titles in 1970–1971 and the world title in 1970. Between 1969 and 1972 he set eight ratified world records. His 1972 record in the press was never surpassed, as that event was discontinued the same year. Ivanchenko was left out of the 1972 Olympic team due to a fever. He retired in 1979 to become a weightlifting coach.

References

1947 births
People from Gagarinsky District, Smolensk Oblast
Living people
Soviet male weightlifters
World Weightlifting Championships medalists
World record holders in Olympic weightlifting
World record setters in weightlifting
European Weightlifting Championships medalists